Jeannie Rita Ritter (born 14 June 1958) is an American educator and activist who served as the First Lady of Colorado from 2007 until 2011. She is the wife of former Colorado Governor Bill Ritter.

Ritter has helped to raise awareness regarding mental health, citing that her perspective on mental health was influenced by her training as a teacher for emotionally disturbed children and having an older sister who suffers from bipolar disorder. She previously had served in the Peace Corps in Tunisia.

See also
Colorado gubernatorial election, 2006

References

Living people
1958 births
First Ladies and Gentlemen of Colorado
Mental health activists
Schoolteachers from Colorado
American women educators
Peace Corps volunteers
University of Northern Colorado alumni
21st-century American women